Stanley M. Silverberg (1919 – November 13, 1953) was an American lawyer. He worked in the United States Department of Justice under Philip Perlman in the 1940s, before joining the law firm of Samuel Irving Rosenman.

Silverberg attended City College of New York, where he graduated in 1939, and later Harvard Law School, where he was an editor of the Harvard Law Review. He then clerked for Judge Learned Hand at the United States Court of Appeals for the Second Circuit, and Justice Felix Frankfurter at the United States Supreme Court (1943–44).

Silverberg died at Mount Sinai Hospital in Manhattan after a month's illness at age 34.

See also 
 List of law clerks of the Supreme Court of the United States (Seat 2)

References 

1919 births
1953 deaths
20th-century American lawyers
City College of New York alumni
Harvard Law School alumni
Law clerks of the Supreme Court of the United States
United States Department of Justice lawyers
Law clerks of Judge Learned Hand